Kozlovice is the name of several locations in the Czech Republic:

 Kozlovice (Frýdek-Místek District), a municipality and village in the Moravian-Silesian Region
 Kozlovice (Plzeň-South District), a municipality and village in the Plzeň Region
 Kozlovice, a village and administrative part of the city of Přerov in the Olomouc Region